Several ships have been named  :

 JDS Keyaki (PF-15, PF-295), a Kusu-class patrol frigate of the Japan Maritime Self-Defense Force, formerly USS Evansville (PF-70)

Imperial Japanese Navy ship names
Japanese Navy ship names